Gordon MacDonald may refer to:

Gordon MacDonald (Alberta politician) (1866–1941), member of the Legislative Assembly of Alberta
Gordon MacDonald (Scottish politician) (born 1960), Member of the Scottish Parliament
Gordon Macdonald, 1st Baron Macdonald of Gwaenysgor (1885–1966), British Labour Party politician and Newfoundland's final British governor
Gordon A. Macdonald (1911–1978), American volcanologist
Gordon J. F. MacDonald (1929–2002), geophysicist and environmental scientist
Gordon J. MacDonald (born 1961), Chief Justice of the New Hampshire Supreme Court
Gordon MacDonald (American football) (1902–1950), American football and basketball player and coach
Gordon MacDonald (editor) (born 1967), British educator and magazine editor
Gordon MacDonald, actor and partner of Holly Hunter